This is a list of wars that began between 1945 and 1989. Other wars can be found in the historical lists of wars and the list of wars extended by diplomatic irregularity. Major conflicts of this period include the Chinese Civil War in Asia, the Greek Civil War and the Northern Ireland conflict in Europe, the Colombian civil war known as La Violencia in South America, the Vietnam War in Southeast Asia, the Ethiopian Civil War in Africa, and the Guatemalan Civil War in North America.

1945–1949

1950–1959

1960–1969

1970–1979

1980–1989

See also
 List of wars 1990–2002
 List of wars 2003–present

References

Notes

1945-1989
1945-1989